The girls' doubles of the tournament 2018 BWF World Junior Championships was held on 12–18 November. The defending champions from the last edition are Baek Ha-na / Lee Yu-rim from Korea.

Seeds 

  Liu Xuanxuan / Xia Yuting (champions)
  Febriana Dwipuji Kusuma / Ribka Sugiarto (semifinals)
  Pearly Tan Koong Le / Toh Ee Wei (final)
  Agatha Imanuela / Siti Fadia Silva Ramadhanti (semifinals)
  Amalie Magelund / Freja Ravn (quarterfinals)
  Anastasiya Prozorova / Valeriya Rudakova (second round)
  Chen Yingying / Zhang Shuxian (quarterfinals)
  Milou Lugters / Alyssa Tirtosentono (second round)

  Jang Eun-seo / Lee Jung-hyun  (fourth round)  
  Li Zi-qing /Teng Chun-hsun (fourth round)  
  Elena Andreu / Ana Carbon (second round)
  Nita Violina Marwah / Putri Syaikah (fourth round)
  Christine Busch / Amalie Schulz (fourth round)
  Sharone Bauer / Ainoa Desmons (third round)
  Pornpicha Choeikeewong / Pornnicha Suwatnodom (third round)
  Léonice Huet / Juliette Moinard (second round)

Draw

Finals

Top half

Section 1

Section 2

Section 3

Section 4

Bottom half

Section 5

Section 6

Section 7

Section 8

References

2018 BWF World Junior Championships